Joe Burman (11 December 1898– 8 April 1979) was a British born American boxer who was briefly awarded the World bantamweight championship by the New York State Athletic Commission, when reigning champion Joe Lynch cancelled a bout with him scheduled for October 19, 1923.  Burman defeated five world champions in his career, Pete Herman, Sammy Mandell, Joe Lynch, Charles Ledoux, and Johnny McCoy and was rated among the top bantamweight boxers in the world for several years.  He had only three losses and was never knocked out in an exceptional career that spanned eight years, and included as many as 120  bouts.

Early life and career
Burman was born in London, England, on December 11, 1898 to a large Jewish family of six children, who emigrated to the United States in his early youth.  His father was of Russian-Jewish heritage, and his mother was of Polish origin.  In his early career, he boxed frequently in New York, fighting his first professional bout around seventeen.  On December 3, 1915, he defeated Young Pope in a four round points decision at the Argus in New York in his first prize fight.

He lost to Johnny Ertle or Ertel, a disputed claimant to the world bantamweight championship, on November 21, 1917 in a ten round newspaper decision at the Arcadia Rink in Milwaukee.  Burman uncharacteristically scored well with a straight left in the early rounds, but Ertle later countered strongly with his right to the face of Burman, throwing more telling blows.  The only knockdown of the close fight came in the eighth when Burman briefly knocked Ertle off balance while he delivered a punch. Burman dominated by the tenth, and in two instances may have nearly had Burman close to a knockout.

He lost to 1922 world junior featherweight champion Jack "Kid" Wolfe in a close ten round newspaper decision in Buffalo, New York, on January 23, 1920. His opponent forced the battle and landed harder and more precise blows in the last four rounds, turning the decision of most newspapers against Burman.  Wolfe, a slightly awkward boxer, but powerful hitter, carried a strong punch with his right which he delivered well in the fourth, sixth, ninth, and tenth rounds. In the ninth and tenth, after the boxers were warned against clinching, Wolfe found openings to score sufficiently against Burman to take the decision. Both boxers, being evenly matched, clinched frequently throughout the bout and were forced to fight at close range, displeasing the vocal crowd.  In two other meetings with Wolfe, in the prior two months, Burman was unable to win a newspaper decision, scoring one draw and another loss.

Win over bantam champ Pete Herman
In an important victory on September 6, 1920, Burman defeated reigning world bantamweight champion Pete Herman in a non-title bout at the Colliseum in St. Louis in an eight round newspaper decision.  Burman was awarded five rounds, for clearly landing more blows and taking the more aggressive stance, with Herman taking two, and the rest considered even.

He defeated French bantamweight champion Charles Ledoux, on September 20, 1920 in an eight round newspaper decision of three leading Philadelphia newspapers at Philadelphia's Olympia Athletic Club.  Burman won as many of six of the eight rounds, showing clever boxing and ruggedness against the  blows of his opponent.  He defeated Ledoux in two other meetings and drew once in ten rounds in November 1920.

According to the Chicago Tribune, Burman defeated 1919 world bantamweight champion Jackie Sharkey in New York in a ten round no-decision bout on June 19, 1917.  In a more widely publicized meeting that featured a boxing card of champions on June 21, 1921, the two drew in a ten round points decision at the newly opened boxing drome in the Bronx. In a lightning fast fight that focused on in-fighting, both boxers went repeatedly to the body.  There were minute long rallies that had the impressive crowd of 25,000 enthralled at several points in the bout.  In another widely publicized meeting on October 10, 1920, the two drew in a newspaper decision in East Chicago.  Burman, who was known as a good outside fighter, scored with left jabs and right crosses, while Sharkey, with a slight disadvantage in reach, dominated the infighting.  Burman, who was clearly the aggressor, may have dealt fewer blows, but they landed with more steam than Sharkey's at most points in the bout.

Burman met Sammy Sandow, another Jewish boxer with Russian ancestry, and won a ten round newspaper decision on March 31, 1922 in Detroit.  The bout featured no knockdowns.  Sandow used his reach advantage to send left jabs to Sandow's face, while Sandow was forced to fight in close.  Burman's strong right was usually well defended by Sandow's use of a crouch to fend them off.  In a previous meeting, a twelve round points decision in Baltimore on April 30, 1920, Sandow had won decisively.  Burman was probably hit twice for every blow landed on his opponent, and Sandow put him to the canvas briefly in the eight with a right.  Sandow began to build a points lead in the sixth through tenth, and scored heavily in the eighth, ninth, and eleventh.

Close loss to champion Sammy Mandell

In an important bout against a top contender Burman met 1926 world lightweight champion Sammy Mandell in a close no decision ten round bout in Aurora, Illinois, on April 29, 1922, losing in the opinion of most, though not all, local newspapers. A low blow foul against Burman in the fourth hurt his chances to obtain the decision from many newspapers.  The Chicago Tribune gave Burman six of the ten rounds in the close bout, believing his blows to Mandell's midsection throughout the bout were more telling than those he received to his head and body from his opponent.

Career highlights
In an important upset Burman defeated reigning world bantamweight champion Joe Lynch, at least by newspaper decision of the Chicago Tribune, on March 19, 1923 in a ten round match before 10,000 fans at Dexter Park in Chicago.  The Cincinnati Enquirer gave Burman six rounds, Lynch only two, and two were scored as even. The win spotlighted Burman as a top contender for the title, and was a turn in his favor as Burman had lost to Lynch by a significant margin in six rounds in Philadelphia on October 25, 1919 and in another short bout in 1921.

World bantam champ, 1923
In his most important contest, Burman was scheduled to fight a rematch with bantamweight champion Joe Lynch at Madison Square Garden in a rare title match on October 19, 1923.  The contest was cancelled by Lynch's handlers, who claimed he was suffering from a shoulder injury. The New York State Athletic Commission (NYSAC), believing the injury was not serious, ordered Lynch to fight, and when he refused and failed to appear for the weigh-in, the NYSAC officially stripped him of the bantamweight title and awarded it to Burman.

Loss of Bantam title
New York Jewish boxer Abe Goldstein accepted the commission's call to replace Lynch.  The bout was scheduled at Madision Square Garden on October 19, 1923, the same date as the scheduled bout with Lynch.  Both Goldstein and Burman made weight the day of the contest, and the NYSAC sanctioned the match as a title bout. Burman, however, lost the close and exciting bout in a twelve round points decision.  Ray Arcel, Goldstein's exceptional trainer, later wrote that Goldstein had not had time to fully train for the bout due to the short notice he was given to substitute for Lynch.  Goldstein was awarded five of the rounds, Burman three, and four were even.  Goldstein reached Burman's chin with his left in the early rounds repeatedly, though Burman scored with a strong right to his opponent's jaw in the second. Goldstein took the match with the effective use of his left, and a sufficient advantage in points scoring in at least five of the rounds.  The Pittsburgh Gazette Times gave Burman only two of the rounds, the seventh when he connected with solid rights to Goldstein's jaw, and the tenth, and noted that Goldstein had a wide margin in the first three rounds.  Though nearly blinded by a gash above his eye, Goldstein held Burman to a draw in points in the final two rounds, which strongly aided the judges in awarding him the decision.

Stripped of world bantam title
Because the NYSAC's brief award of the world bantamweight title was not won in a ring battle, and as Burman could not defeat Abe Goldstein in the sanctioned world bantamweight contest at Madison Square Garden, his two day award of the title was not subsequently recognized by the NYSAC or any other sanctioning body.

Burman defeated Johnny McCoy (who would become the 1927 world flyweight champion), on December 21, 1923 in a late career ten round newspaper decision in Blue Island, Illinois.  Burman proved the superior boxer in all but one round, and in the sixth through tenth had McCoy desperately hanging on and badly fatigued. McCoy survived the late rounds by well timed clinching that gave him just enough time to recover.  He staggered Burman in the third, but it was his only round, while Burman charged back and hammered his opponent in the fourth.  Burman's subsequent place in boxing history was diminished considerably, though his record was outstanding and his performance against five boxing champions included four wins, with a possible win over the fifth, Sammy Mandell.

Life after boxing
He appeared as himself in the Selig Athletic Feature film #44, a boxing documentary produced by William Nicholas Selig, along with boxer Johnny Ertle, and wrestlers Sam Varrion and Ben Ruben.

After retiring from boxing around 1924, Burman ran a popular custom men's clothing store in Chicago's Loop district.  In 1928, he was back in the newspapers when he was shot in the leg in Chicago's Davis hotel and could not tell police who shot him or why.

He worked as a matchmaker and promoter at Chicago's Marigold Gardens in the early 1950s before later moving to the west coast around 1959.

After working as a liquor salesman in Los Angeles, Burman died there on April 8, 1979, after a long bout with liver cancer.  Services were held at Hillside Memorial on April 10, in Culver City, California.

Professional boxing record
All information in this section is derived from BoxRec, unless otherwise stated.

Official record

All newspaper decisions are officially regarded as “no decision” bouts and are not counted in the win/loss/draw column.

Unofficial record

Record with the inclusion of newspaper decisions in the win/loss/draw column.

References

External links

1898 births
1979 deaths
Bantamweight boxers
Jewish American boxers
Jewish boxers
American people of Polish-Jewish descent
American people of Russian-Jewish descent
American male boxers
British emigrants to the United States
British Jews
20th-century American Jews